The 2022–23 Sacramento State Hornets women's basketball team represents California State University, Sacramento during the 2022–23 NCAA Division I women's basketball season. The Hornets are led by second year head coach Mark Campbell and play their home games at Hornets Nest. They are members of the Big Sky Conference.

Roster

Schedule

|-
!colspan=9 style=| Non-conference regular season

|-
!colspan=9 style=| Big Sky regular season

|-
!colspan=9 style=| Big Sky Women's Tournament

|-
!colspan=9 style=| NCAA Women's Tournament

See also
 2022–23 Sacramento State Hornets men's basketball team

References

Sacramento State Hornets women's basketball seasons
Sacramento State
2022 in sports in California
2023 in sports in California
Sacramento State